Hellinsia surinamensis is a moth of the family Pterophoridae. It is found in Suriname, Argentina, Bolivia, Colombia, Ecuador, Paraguay and Uruguay.

The wingspan is 21‑24 mm. The forewings are ochreous‑brown and the markings are dark brown. The hindwings are grey‑brown and the fringes grey. Adults are on wing in March and June.

The larvae feed on Solanum bonariensis, Solanum pseudocapsicum and Solanum verbascifolium.

References

surinamensis
Moths described in 1855
Pterophoridae of South America
Fauna of Ecuador
Fauna of Paraguay
Moths of South America
Taxa named by Jan Sepp